The 1975 Canada Winter Games were hosted in Lethbridge, Alberta from 11–23 February 1975. Despite being hosted by Lethbridge, the games were held in 12 communities in southern Alberta spread out over 34,000 km2 (13,127 sq mi). More than 4,000 local volunteers helped with the event.

The Canada Games caused improvements to sporting events throughout the region, including the construction of the $4 million Canada Games Sportplex.

Medals

Source:

See also
Canada Games
Canada Winter Games
List of Canada Games

References

External links
1975 Canada Winter Games 

Sport in Lethbridge
Canada Games, 1975
Canada Games
Winter multi-sport events in Canada
Canada Games, 1975
Canada Winter Games